The Democratic Labour Party (DLP), formerly the Democratic Labor Party, is an Australian political party. It broke off from the Australian Labor Party (ALP) as a result of the 1955 ALP split, originally under the name Australian Labor Party (Anti-Communist), and was renamed the Democratic Labor Party in 1957. In 1962, the Queensland Labor Party, a breakaway party of the Queensland branch of the Australian Labor Party, became the Queensland branch of the DLP.

The DLP was represented in the Senate from its formation through to 1974. The party held or shared the balance of power on several occasions, winning 11 percent of the vote at its peak in 1970, which resulted in it holding five out of the 60 Senate seats. It has never achieved representation in the House of Representatives but, due to Australia's instant-runoff voting system, it remained influential due to its recommendations for preference allocations. With anti-communism as a strong priority, the DLP almost always directed that its voters preference the Liberal Party and Country Party ahead of the ALP, contributing to the electoral dominance of the Coalition during the 1950s and 1960s. The DLP won seats in the state parliaments of Victoria, Queensland and New South Wales.

In 1978, the DLP's Victorian branch was dissolved, but was soon revived and continued to contest elections. The DLP had no parliamentary representation for a period of 30 years from 1976 to 2006. DLP candidates were elected to the Victorian Legislative Council in 2006 and 2014, and a single senator was elected in 2010, with a platform focused more on social conservatism. In 2013, the party changed its name to reflect the standard Australian English spelling of "labour". In March 2022, the party was federally de-registered by the Australian Electoral Commission after it was unable to prove it had more than the legally required 1500 members. The party remains registered for state elections in Victoria and territorial elections in the Australian Capital Territory. In November 2022, a DLP candidate was once again elected to the Victorian Legislative Council.

History

Origins

The Australian Labor Party (Anti-Communist) was formed as a result of a split in the Australian Labor Party (ALP) which began in 1954. The split was between the party's national leadership, under the then party leader Dr H. V. Evatt, and the majority of the Victorian branch, which was dominated by a faction composed largely of ideologically driven anti-Communist Catholics. Many ALP members during the Cold War period, most but not all of them Catholics, became alarmed at what they saw as the growing power of the Communist Party of Australia within the country's trade unions. These members formed units within the unions, called Industrial Groups, to combat this alleged infiltration.

The intellectual leader of the Victorian Catholic wing of the ALP (although not actually a party member) was B. A. Santamaria, a lay Catholic anti-Communist activist, who acquired the patronage of Dr Mannix. Santamaria headed The Catholic Social Studies Movement (often known as The Movement), modeled on Catholic Action groups in Europe and, ironically, in organizational terms, on some of the methods employed by its principal target, the Communist Party of Australia. That group later became the National Civic Council (NCC). Evatt denounced the "Movement" and the Industrial Groups in 1954, alleging they were trying to take over the ALP and turn it into a Catholic Centre Party that would be Liberal-esque, or even of fascist persuasion.

At the 1955 ALP national conference in Hobart, Santamaria's parliamentary supporters in the federal and Victorian parliaments were expelled from the ALP. A total of seven Victorian federal MPs and 18 state MPs were expelled. The federal MPs were: Tom Andrews, Bill Bourke, Bill Bryson, Jack Cremean, Bob Joshua, Stan Keon and Jack Mullens. In New South Wales, the Roman Catholic Archbishop of Sydney, Norman Cardinal Gilroy, the first native-born Australian Roman Catholic prelate, opposed the Movement's tactics, and there was no party split in that state.

The expelled ALP members formed the Australian Labor Party (Anti-Communist) under the influence of B. A. Santamaria.

1950s to 1970s

1955 elections
On the night of 19 April 1955, Liberal and Country Party leader Henry Bolte moved a motion of no-confidence against John Cain's Labor government in the Victorian Legislative Assembly. After twelve hours of debate on the motion, in the early hours of 20 April, 11 of the expelled Labor members crossed the floor to support Bolte's motion. With his government defeated, Cain sought and received a dissolution of parliament later that day, with the election set down for 28 May 1955.

At the election, 11 of the 12 expelled MPs in the Victorian Legislative Assembly, as well as other candidates, and the one MP facing re-election in the Victorian Legislative Council lost their seats. The party drew 12.6% of the vote, mainly from the ALP, which was directed to the non-Labor parties. Labor won 37.6% of the vote and 20 seats to the Liberals' 34 and the Country Party's ten. The Cain Labor Government lost government at the 1955 election. Only one of the expelled Labor members, Frank Scully, was re-elected for the seat of Richmond. Scully had been a Minister in the Cain Government and a member of the Movement, and was expelled from the ministry and the ALP as part of the 1955 split. Five other MPs whose terms had not expired remained in the Legislative Council until the expiry of their terms at the 1958 Victorian election, and all who recontested their seats were defeated.

At the 1955 federal election held in December, all the 7 expelled federal MPs were defeated. However, Frank McManus was elected as a senator for Victoria at the 1955 election, and successful ALP candidate George Cole had chosen before the election to become part of this party.

Membership
The parliamentary membership of the ALP (Anti-Communist) was almost entirely Roman Catholic of Irish descent. The only two non-Catholics were its federal leader, Bob Joshua, who represented Ballarat in the Australian House of Representatives, and Jack Little, who led the party in the Victoria Legislative Council between 1955 and 1958. It has been suggested that the party was substantially a party of Irish-ethnics, a result of the ALP split of 1955 being a 'de-ethnicisation', a forcible removal of the Irish-Catholic element within the ALP. However, many ALP (Anti-Communist) members were not of Irish descent. The party attracted many voters among migrants from Catholic countries in southern Europe, and among anti-Communist Eastern European refugees.

A significant  minority of its voters were also non-Catholics. Journalist Don Whitington argued in 1964 that the DLP, as a basically sectarian party, was a most dangerous and distasteful force in Australian politics. Whitington observed that the party was backed by influential sections of the Roman Catholic Church, and that although the party professed to exist primarily to combat communism, it had less commendable reasons behind its coming into being. Daniel Mannix, the Roman Catholic Archbishop of Melbourne, was a DLP supporter, as were other influential clerics.

Democratic Labor Party
In 1957, the party changed its name to the Democratic Labor Party (DLP). In the same year, the Labor Party split in Queensland following the expulsion of Vince Gair, a conservative Catholic, from the party. He and his followers formed the Queensland Labor Party, which, in 1962, became the Queensland branch of the DLP.

Between 1955 and 1974 the DLP was able to command a significant vote, particularly in Victoria and Queensland, with their large numbers of Catholics. During the period the party held between one and five seats in the Senate (which is elected by proportional representation). The DLP Senate leaders were George Cole (from Tasmania; 1955–1965), Vince Gair (from Queensland; 1965–1973), and Frank McManus (from Victoria; 1973–1974). Other DLP Senators were Condon Byrne (from Queensland), Jack Kane (from New South Wales), and Jack Little, a Protestant (from Victoria).

No DLP Senators or state politicians were ever elected in South Australia or Western Australia. Owing largely to demographic reasons, the ALP did not split in these states, although some lay branch members switched to the new party once it had been established. As the ALP and the conservative parties traditionally held approximately equal numbers of seats in the Senate, the DLP was able to use the balance of power in the Senate to extract concessions from Liberal governments, particularly larger government grants to Catholic schools, greater spending on defence, and non-recognition of the People's Republic of China.

During this period the DLP exercised influence by directing its preferences to Liberal candidates in federal and state elections (see Australian electoral system), thus helping to keep the ALP out of office at the federal level and in Victoria. The DLP vote for the House of Representatives gradually declined during the 1960s, but remained strong enough for the Liberals to continue to need DLP preferences to win close elections.

After Evatt's retirement in 1960, his successor Arthur Calwell, a Catholic, tried to bring about a reconciliation between the ALP and the DLP. Negotiations were conducted through intermediaries, and in 1965 a deal was almost done. Three out of four of the ALP's parliamentary leaders agreed to a deal. However, Calwell refused to share power within the party with the DLP leadership on a membership number basis, so the deal failed. Santamaria later claimed that had he accepted, Calwell could have become Prime Minister. Indeed, at the 1961 federal election Labor came up just two seats short of toppling the Coalition. One of those seats was Bruce, in the DLP's heartland of Melbourne. DLP preferences allowed Liberal Billy Snedden to win a paper-thin victory. Although the Coalition was only assured of a sixth term in government later in the night with an even narrower win in the Brisbane-area seat of Moreton, any realistic chance of a Labor win ended with the Liberals retaining Bruce. Without Bruce, the best Labor could have done was a hung parliament.

At the 1969 federal election, DLP preferences kept Calwell's successor Gough Whitlam from toppling the Coalition, despite winning an 18-seat swing and a majority of the two-party vote. DLP preferences in four Melbourne-area seats allowed the Liberals to narrowly retain them; had those preferences gone the other way, Labor would have garnered the swing it needed to make Whitlam Prime Minister.

The DLP's policies were traditional Labor policies such as more spending on health, education and pensions, combined with strident opposition to communism, and a greater emphasis on defence spending. The DLP strongly supported Australia's participation in the Vietnam War.

From the early 1960s onward the DLP became increasingly socially conservative, opposing homosexuality, abortion, pornography and drug use. This stand against "permissiveness" appealed to many conservative voters as well as the party's base among Catholics. Some members of the DLP disagreed with this, believing the party should stay focused on anti-communism.

The highest DLP vote was 11.11 per cent, which occurred at the 1970 half-senate election. Whitlam and the ALP won government in the 1972 election, defeating the DLP's strategy of keeping the ALP out of power.

Decline
In 1973, it was reported that the Country Party and the DLP were considering a merger. In response, Gough Whitlam said he "would be delighted to see 'the old harlot churched'".

By this point, the party's emphasis on Senate results had led to a steady decline in their primary vote for the House of Representatives, and according to Tom King of Australian National University a large amount of the support for the DLP by this point came as a result of protest votes against the two major parties, rather than any definitive ideological base. A softening of attitudes towards Communism both in Australia and within the Catholic Church meant that the party increasingly sounded old-fashioned and ideologically adrift, a perception that was not helped by the advanced age of the DLP's parliamentarians.

In 1974 Whitlam appointed Gair as ambassador to the Republic of Ireland in a successful bid to split the DLP and remove its influence. The party lost all its Senate seats at the 1974 federal election.

By 1978, DLP branches in all states other than Victoria had ceased to operate.  In 1978, the Victorian branch voted to dissolve The vote to dissolve was carried by 110 votes to 100. Some members of the party refused to accept the vote and formed a new DLP, which they claimed was a continuation of the original DLP.

Return to parliament

2006 State Election 
At the 2006 Victorian election, the DLP won parliamentary representation for the first time since the 1970s when it won a seat in the Victorian Legislative Council, after fielding candidates in the eight regions of the reformed Council, where proportional representation gave the party the best chance of having members elected. The DLP received 2.7 per cent of the primary vote in the Western Victoria Region, enough to elect Peter Kavanagh on ALP preferences. The party briefly looked set to have a second member elected, party leader John Mulholland, in the Northern Metropolitan Region on 5.1 per cent, but that result was overturned after a recount. Following the election of Kavanagh, attention was given to the DLP platform of opposition to abortion and poker machines.

The Labor government required an additional two non-ALP upper house members to pass legislation, which gave the balance of power to the Greens who held three seats. Kavanagh failed to retain his seat at the 2010 Victorian election.

In late August 2009, Melbourne newspaper The Age reported that the DLP was facing several internal divisions between Kavanagh's faction, which also sought to include evangelical and fundamentalist Protestants within the party, and 'hardline' conservative Catholics. Right to Life Australia President Marcel White and a close associate, Peter McBroom, were reported to be emphasising Catholic doctrinal and devotional concerns, like Marian apparitions, Catholic prayer, praying the rosary and campaigns against the "evils of contraception". Kavanagh was reported as threatening to leave the organisation if the 'hardline' elements were to triumph within the Victorian DLP. In the end, the minority 'hardline' group was expelled from the party.

2010 Federal Election

Shortly after counting began in the aftermath of the 2010 federal election, DLP candidate, federal DLP vice-president, and state DLP president John Madigan looked likely to be elected as the sixth and final Senator for Victoria, which was confirmed a few weeks later. Preference counts indicated that the primary DLP vote of 2.33 per cent (75,145 votes) in Victoria reached the 14.3 per cent quota required by gaining One Nation, Christian Democratic and Building Australia preferences to edge out Steve Fielding of the Family First Party who received a primary vote of 2.64 per cent. The DLP received Family First preferences, and when the Australian Sex Party candidate was excluded, the DLP gained Liberal Democratic Party preferences, overtaking the third Liberal/National candidate and gaining their preferences to win the last seat.

Elected for a six-year term from 1 July 2011, Madigan was the first Senator to be elected as a federal member of the Democratic Labor Party of Australia since the 1970 Senate-only election. Madigan was in a balance of power position following the 2013 election where an additional six non-government Senators were required to pass legislation. In his maiden speech to the Senate, Madigan denounced Victoria's "inhumane" abortion laws and committed to help restore Australia's dwindling manufacturing sector. He called for a "good Labor government that will bring something better to the people". He said that the DLP and ALP differed in a number of ways.

In December 2011, Madigan launched the Australian Manufacturing and Farming Program, with Senator Nick Xenophon and MP Bob Katter, an initiative to provide a forum for discussion of issues impacting manufacturers and farmers, together with politicians. As a representative of the DLP, Madigan took an unashamed anti-abortion stance. His additional publicly stated positions on behalf of the DLP included opposition to same-sex marriage; opposition to the sale of public infrastructure; opposition to a carbon tax, stating "We're not in favour of a carbon tax because we believe it's a tax on people and a tax on life"; an advocate for shops closing at midday on Saturdays; and at the Inaugural Jack Kane dinner in July 2011, Madigan advocated Chifley protectionist economics. Also, Madigan has publicly expressed his concern for human rights in West Papua.

Infighting and financial issues
It was reported in June 2010 that the party was on the brink of collapse, with rampant party infighting and less than $10,000 in the bank. On 18 March 2011 the Victorian Supreme Court handed down a reserved judgment confirming John Mulholland's valid removal as secretary. This decision was subsequently reversed by the full bench of the Victorian Supreme Court however the Court also rejected Mulholland's claim that he was still the secretary of the DLP at the time the ruling was handed down. A Senate petition in August 2011 from Mulholland requested that current DLP Senator John Madigan be removed from the Senate, with the petition lodged using a residual standing order of the chamber that has not been deployed successfully by anyone for more than a century. In his petition, Mulholland says Madigan put himself forward in the 2010 election as a DLP candidate "although the DLP federal executive did not authorise or recognise his candidacy or have any part in his nomination".

In September 2014 Madigan resigned from the DLP and became an independent Senator, citing long-term internal party tensions and claiming he had been undermined by a member of his staff. DLP federal president Paul Funnell strongly rejected Madigan's claims and demanded that he resign from the Senate so that his seat could be taken by a DLP member.

2014 State Election 
The DLP was elected to the upper house region of Western Metropolitan, with candidate Dr Rachel Carling-Jenkins winning 2.6% of the vote, despite suffering a 0.5% swing. On 26 June 2017, Carling-Jenkins resigned from the DLP to join Cory Bernardi's Australian Conservatives.

2022 State Election 
Victorian Upper House MP Bernie Finn joined the DLP after his expulsion from the Liberal Party.
Victorian Upper House MP Adem Somyurek joined the DLP, having previously been an Independent, and before that a Labor Party member. 
At the 2022 Victorian election, the DLP ran a very effective campaign that saw its support surge to 7.66% of the vote in its best seat and 3.51% (131,600 votes) overall in the upper house. This was the fifth highest vote of any party in Victoria and the best result the DLP had achieved in fifty years. 
Adem Somyurek was elected to the upper house region of Northern Metropolitan with 4.75% of the vote. However, despite winning 5.16% of the vote, after preference distribution Bernie Finn narrowly missed out on re-election in the Western Metropolitan Region by only 210 votes, with Legalise Cannabis Party preferences instead electing a third Liberal candidate.

Electoral results

Federal

State

Victoria

Federal parliamentary leaders

Members of Parliament
Includes both Australian Labor Party (Anti-Communist) and Democratic Labor Party parliamentarians.
Australian House of Representatives
Tom Andrews (Darebin, Vic), 1955
Bill Bourke (Fawkner, Vic), 1955
Bill Bryson (Wills, Vic), 1955
Jack Cremean (Gellibrand, Vic), 1955
Bob Joshua (Ballarat, Vic), 1955 (Protestant)
Stan Keon (Yarra, Vic), 1955
Jack Mullens (Hoddle, Vic), 1955
Australian Senate
George Cole (Tas), 1955–65
Frank McManus (Vic), 1955–62, 1965–74
Vince Gair (Qld), 1965–74
Condon Byrne (Qld), 1968–74 (QLP Senator 1957–59)
Jack Little (Vic), 1968–74 (Protestant)
Jack Kane (NSW), 1970–74
John Madigan (Vic), 2010–14
Victorian Legislative Assembly
Bill Barry (Carlton), 1955
Stan Corrigan (Port Melbourne), 1955
Leslie D'Arcy (Grant), 1955
George Fewster (Essendon), 1955
Tom Hayes (Melbourne), 1955
Michael Lucy (Ivanhoe), 1955
Edmund Morrissey (Mernda), 1955
Charles Murphy (Hawthorn), 1955
Joseph O'Carroll (Clifton Hill), 1955
Peter Randles (Brunswick), 1955
Frank Scully (Richmond), 1955–58
George White (Mentone), 1955
Victorian Legislative Council
Bert Bailey (Melbourne West), 1955–58
Thomas Brennan (Monash), 1955–58
Les Coleman (Melbourne West), 1955
Paul Jones (Doutta Galla), 1955–58
Jack Little (Melbourne North), 1955–58 (Protestant)
Pat Sheehy (Melbourne), 1955–58
Peter Kavanagh (Western Victoria), 2006–10
 Rachel Carling-Jenkins (Western Metropolitan), 2014–17 (Protestant)
 Bernie Finn (Western Metropolitan), 2022
 Adem Somyurek (Northern Metropolitan), 2022–present (Muslim)
New South Wales Legislative Assembly
Kevin Harrold (Gordon), 1973–76
Legislative Assembly of Queensland
 Les Diplock (Aubigny), 1962–72 (QLP 1957–62) (Protestant)
 Paul Hilton (Carnarvon), 1962–63 (QLP 1957–62)

See also
 Australian Labor Party

References

Further reading
 Lyle Allan (1988), "Irish Ethnicity and the Democratic Labor Party," Politics, Vol. 23 No.2, Pages 28–34
 Niall Brennan (1964), Dr Mannix, Adelaide, South Australia, Rigby.
 Ken Buckley, Barbara Dale and Wayne Reynolds. Doc Evatt, Melbourne, Victoria, Longman Cheshire (1994); 
 Arthur Calwell. Be Just and Fear Not, Hawthorn, Victoria, Lloyd O'Neil (1972); 
 Bob Corcoran (2001), "The Manifold Causes of the Labor Split", in Peter Love and Paul Strangio (eds.), Arguing the Cold War, Carlton North, Victoria, Red Rag Publications. 
 Brian Costar, Peter Love and Paul Strangio (eds.) The Great Labor Schism. A Retrospective, Melbourne, Victoria, Scribe Publications, 2005; 
 Peter Crockett. Evatt. A Life, South Melbourne, Victoria, Oxford University Press (1993); 
 Allan Dalziel. Evatt. The Enigma, Melbourne, Victoria, Lansdowne Press (1967).
 Gavan Duffy. Demons and Democrats. 1950s Labor at the Crossroads, North Melbourne, Victoria, Freedom Publishing (2002); 
 Gil Duthie. I had 50,000 bosses. Memoirs of a Labor backbencher 1946-1975, Sydney, NSW, Angus and Robertson (1984); 
 John Faulkner and Stuart Macintyre (eds.) True Believers. The Story of the Federal Parliamentary Labor Party, Crows Nest, NSW, Allen and Unwin (2001); 
 Ross Fitzgerald, Adam James Carr and William J. Dealy. The Pope's Battalions. Santamaria, Catholicism and the Labor Split, St Lucia, Queensland, University of Queensland Press (2003); 
 Ross Fitzgerald and Stephen Holt. Alan "The Red Fox" Reid. Pressman Par Excellence, Sydney, NSW, University of New South Wales Press; 
James Franklin, "Catholic Thought and Catholic Action: Dr Paddy Ryan Msc.," Journal of the Australian Catholic Historical Society (1996) 17:44-55 online.
 Colm Kiernan. Calwell. A Personal and Political Biography, West Melbourne, Thomas Nelson (1978); 
 
 Michael Lyons (2008), "Defence, the Family and the Battler: The Democratic Labor Party and its Legacy," Australian Journal of Political Science, September, 43–3, Pages 425–442.
 Frank McManus (1977), The Tumult and the Shouting, Adelaide, South Australia, Rigby.  
 Patrick Morgan (ed.) B. A. Santamaria. Your Most Obedient Servant. Selected Letters: 1918 – 1996, Carlton, Victoria, Miegunyah Press (2007); 
 Patrick Morgan (ed.) Running the Show. Selected Documents: 1939-1996, Carlton, Victoria, Miegunyah Press (2008); 
 Robert Murray (1970), The Split. Australian Labor in the fifties, Melbourne, Victoria, F.W. Cheshire. 
 Paul Ormonde (1972), The Movement, Melbourne, Victoria, Thomas Nelson. 
 Paul Ormonde (2000), "The Movement – Politics by Remote Control," in Paul Ormonde (ed.) Santamaria. The Politics of Fear, Richmond, Victoria, Spectrum Publications. 
 P.L Reynolds (1974), The Democratic Labor Party, Milton, Queensland, Jacaranda. 
 B. A. Santamaria. Against the Tide, Melbourne, Victoria, Oxford University Press (1981); 
 Kylie Tennant. Evatt. Politics and Justice, Cremorne, NSW, Angus and Robertson (1970); 
 Tom Truman. Catholic Action and Politics, London, England, The Merlin Press (1960).
 Kate White. John Cain and Victorian Labor 1917-1957, Sydney, NSW, Hale and Iremonger (1982);

External links
 
Statement by Frank Scully about the DLP's formation
"The split – 50 years on"
Australian Biography interview with B.A. Santamaria

1955 establishments in Australia
Conservative parties in Australia
Labour parties
Australian Labor Party breakaway groups
Catholic political parties
Anti-communism in Australia
Political parties established in 1955
Political parties in Victoria (Australia)
Social conservative parties
Distributism